Simone Aldrovandi (born 2 April 1994) is an Italian footballer who plays as a defender for Mantova.

Club career
Born in Carpi, Aldrovandi began his career on Modena's youth categories, and made his first-team debut on 23 November 2011, coming on as a second-half substitute in a 0–3 loss at Chievo, for the campaign's Coppa Italia. On 9 July 2013 he joined Serie A side Chievo.

References

External links

1994 births
Living people
Italian footballers
Association football defenders
Modena F.C. players
A.C. ChievoVerona players
Serie B players